Existence is the ability of an entity to interact with reality. In philosophy, it refers to the ontological property of being.

Etymology 
The term existence comes from Old French existence, from Medieval Latin existentia/exsistentia, from Latin existere, to come forth, be manifest, ex + sistere, to stand.

Context in philosophy 
Materialism holds that the only things that exist are matter and energy, that all things are composed of material, that all actions require energy, and that all phenomena (including consciousness) are the result of the interaction of matter. Dialectical materialism does not make a distinction between being and existence, and defines it as the objective reality of various forms of matter.

Idealism holds that the only things that exist are thoughts and ideas, while the material world is secondary. In idealism, existence is sometimes contrasted with transcendence, the ability to go beyond the limits of existence. As a form of epistemological idealism, rationalism interprets existence as cognizable and rational, that all things are composed of strings of reasoning, requiring an associated idea of the thing, and all phenomena (including consciousness) are the result of an understanding of the imprint from the noumenal world in which lies beyond the thing-in-itself.

In scholasticism, existence of a thing is not derived from its essence but is determined by the creative volition of God, the dichotomy of existence and essence demonstrates that the dualism of the created universe is only resolvable through God. Empiricism recognizes existence of singular facts, which are not derivable and which are observable through empirical experience.

The exact definition of existence is one of the most important and fundamental topics of ontology, the philosophical study of the nature of being, existence, or reality in general, as well as of the basic categories of being and their relations. Traditionally listed as a part of the major branch of philosophy known as metaphysics, ontology deals with questions concerning what things or entities exist or can be said to exist, and how such things or entities can be grouped, related within a hierarchy, and subdivided according to similarities and differences.

Historical conceptions 

In the Western tradition of philosophy, the earliest known comprehensive treatments of the subject are from Plato's Phaedo, Republic, and Statesman and Aristotle's Metaphysics, though earlier fragmentary writing exists. Aristotle developed a comprehensive theory of being, according to which only individual things, called substances, fully have to be, but other things such as relations, quantity, time, and place (called the categories) have a derivative kind of being, dependent on individual things. In Aristotle's Metaphysics, there are four causes of existence or change in nature: the material cause, the formal cause, the efficient cause and the final cause.

The Neo-Platonists and some early Christian philosophers argued about whether existence had any reality except in the mind of God. Some taught that existence was a snare and a delusion, that the world, the flesh, and the devil existed only to tempt weak humankind away from God.

In Hindu philosophy, the term Advaita refers to its idea that the true self, Atman, is the same as the highest metaphysical Reality (Brahman). The Upanishads describe the universe, and the human experience, as an interplay of Purusha (the eternal, unchanging principles, consciousness) and Prakṛti (the temporary, changing material world, nature).The former manifests itself as Ātman (Soul, Self), and the latter as Māyā. The Upanishads refer to the knowledge of Atman as "true knowledge" (Vidya), and the knowledge of Maya as "not true knowledge" (Avidya, Nescience, lack of awareness, lack of true knowledge).

The medieval philosopher Thomas Aquinas argued that God is pure being, and that in God essence and existence are the same. More specifically, what is identical in God, according to Aquinas, is God's essence and God's actus essendi. At about the same time, the nominalist philosopher William of Ockham argued, in Book I of his Summa Totius Logicae (Treatise on all Logic, written some time before 1327), that Categories are not a form of Being in their own right, but derivative on the existence of individuals.

Dharmic "middle way" view
The Indian philosopher Nagarjuna (c. 150–250 CE) largely advanced existence concepts and founded the Madhyamaka school of Mahāyāna Buddhism.

In Eastern philosophy, Anicca (Sanskrit anitya) or "impermanence" describes existence. It refers to the fact that all conditioned things (sankhara) are in a constant state of flux. In reality there is no thing that ultimately ceases to exist; only the appearance of a thing ceases as it changes from one form to another. Imagine a leaf that falls to the ground and decomposes. While the appearance and relative existence of the leaf ceases, the components that formed the leaf become particulate material that goes on to form new plants. Buddhism teaches a middle way, avoiding the extreme views of eternalism and nihilism. The middle way recognizes there are vast differences between the way things are perceived to exist and the way things really exist. The differences are reconciled in the concept of Shunyata by addressing the existing object's served purpose for the subject's identity in being. What exists is in non-existence, because the subject changes.

Trailokya elaborates on three kinds of existence, those of desire, form, and formlessness in which there are karmic rebirths. Taken further to the Trikaya doctrine, it describes how the Buddha exists. In this philosophy, it is accepted that Buddha exists in more than one absolute way.

Early modern philosophy
The early modern treatment of the subject derives from Antoine Arnauld and Pierre Nicole's Logic, or The Art of Thinking, better known as the Port-Royal Logic, first published in 1662. Arnauld thought that a proposition or judgment consists of taking two different ideas and either putting them together or rejecting them:

The two terms are joined by the verb "is" (or "is not", if the predicate is denied of the subject). Thus every proposition has three components: the two terms, and the "copula" that connects or separates them. Even when the proposition has only two words, the three terms are still there. For example, "God loves humanity", really means "God is a lover of humanity", "God exists" means "God is a thing".

This theory of judgment dominated logic for centuries, but it has some obvious difficulties: it only considers proposition of the form "All A are B.", a form logicians call universal. It does not allow propositions of the form "Some A are B", a form logicians call existential. If neither A nor B includes the idea of existence, then "some A are B" simply adjoins A to B. Conversely, if A or B do include the idea of existence in the way that "triangle" contains the idea "three angles equal to two right angles", then "A exists" is automatically true, and we have an ontological proof of A's existence. (Arnauld's contemporary Descartes famously argued so, regarding the concept "God" (discourse 4, Meditation 5)). Arnauld's theory was current until the middle of the nineteenth century.

David Hume argued that the claim that a thing exists, when added to our notion of a thing, does not add anything to the concept. For example, if we form a complete notion of Moses, and superadd to that notion the claim that Moses existed, we are not adding anything to the notion of Moses.

Kant also argued that existence is not a "real" predicate, but gave no explanation of how this is possible. His famous discussion of the subject is merely a restatement of Arnauld's doctrine that in the proposition "God is omnipotent", the verb "is" signifies the joining or separating of two concepts such as "God" and "omnipotence". The proposition "A exists" (which is A+existence) would be necessarily false because if A exists, then it is actually (A + existence) which exists, and (A + existence) is, we assumed, different from A. According to Kant, existence can not be an essential property of anything, including God; it is an accidental property of the subject.

Schopenhauer claimed that "everything that exists for knowledge, and hence the whole of this world, only object in relation to the subject, the perception of the perceiver, in a word, representation." According to him there can be "No object without subject" because "everything objective is already conditioned as such in manifold ways by the knowing subject with the forms of its knowing, and presupposes these forms..."

Predicative nature
John Stuart Mill (and also Kant's pupil Herbart) argued that the predicative nature of existence was proved by sentences like "A centaur is a poetic fiction" or "A greatest number is impossible" (Herbart). Franz Brentano challenged this; so also (as is better known) did Frege. Brentano argued that we can join the concept represented by a noun phrase "an A" to the concept represented by an adjective "B" to give the concept represented by the noun phrase "a B-A". For example, we can join "a man" to "wise" to give "a wise man". But the noun phrase "a wise man" is not a sentence, whereas "some man is wise" is a sentence. Hence the copula must do more than merely join or separate concepts. Furthermore, adding "exists" to "a wise man", to give the complete sentence "a wise man exists" has the same effect as joining "some man" to "wise" using the copula. So the copula has the same effect as "exists". Brentano argued that every categorical proposition can be translated into an existential one without change in meaning and that the "exists" and "does not exist" of the existential proposition take the place of the copula. He showed this by the following examples:

 The categorical proposition "Some man is sick" has the same meaning as the existential proposition "A sick man exists" or "There is a sick man."

 The categorical proposition "No stone is living" has the same meaning as the existential proposition "A living stone does not exist" or "there is no living stone".

 The categorical proposition "All men are mortal" has the same meaning as the existential proposition "An immortal man does not exist" or "there is no immortal man".

 The categorical proposition "Some man is not learned" has the same meaning as the existential proposition "A non-learned man exists" or "there is a non-learned man".

Frege developed a similar view (though later) in his great work The Foundations of Arithmetic, as did Charles Sanders Peirce (but Peirce held that the possible and the real are not limited to the actual, individually existent). The Frege-Brentano view is the basis of the dominant position in modern Anglo-American philosophy: that existence is asserted by the existential quantifier (as expressed by Quine's slogan "To be is to be the value of a variable." — On What There Is, 1948).

Semantics
In mathematical logic, there are two quantifiers, "some" and "all", though as Brentano (1838–1917) pointed out, we can make do with just one quantifier and negation. The first of these quantifiers, "some", is also expressed as "there exists". Thus, in the sentence "There exists a man", the term "man" is asserted to be part of existence. But we can also assert, "There exists a triangle." Is a "triangle"—an abstract idea—part of existence in the same way that a "man"—a physical body—is part of existence? Do abstractions such as goodness, blindness, and virtue exist in the same sense that chairs, tables, and houses exist? What categories, or kinds of thing, can be the subject or the predicate of a proposition?

Moreover, does "existence" exist?

In some statements, existence is implied without being mentioned. The statement "A bridge crosses the Thames at Hammersmith" cannot just be about a bridge, the Thames, and Hammersmith. It must be about "existence" as well. On the other hand, the statement "A bridge crosses the Styx at Limbo" has the same form, but while in the first case we understand a real bridge in the real world made of stone or brick, what "existence" would mean in the second case is less clear.

The nominalist approach is to argue that certain noun phrases can be "eliminated" by rewriting a sentence in a form that has the same meaning but does not contain the noun phrase. Thus Ockham argued that "Socrates has wisdom", which apparently asserts the existence of a reference for "wisdom", can be rewritten as "Socrates is wise", which contains only the referring phrase "Socrates". This method became widely accepted in the twentieth century by the analytic school of philosophy.

However, this argument may be inverted by realists in arguing that since the sentence "Socrates is wise" can be rewritten as "Socrates has wisdom", this proves the existence of a hidden referent for "wise".

A further problem is that human beings seem to process information about fictional characters in much the same way that they process information about real people. For example, in the 2008 United States presidential election, a politician and actor named Fred Thompson ran for the Republican Party nomination. In polls, potential voters identified Fred Thompson as a "law and order" candidate. Thompson plays a fictional character on the television series Law and Order. The people who make the comment are aware that Law and Order is fiction, but at some level, they may process fiction as if it were fact, a process included in what is called the Paradox of Fiction. Another example of this is the common experience of actresses who play the villain in a soap opera being accosted in public as if they are to blame for the actions of the characters they play.

A scientist might make a clear distinction between objects that exist, and assert that all objects that exist are made up of either matter or energy. But in the layperson's worldview, existence includes real, fictional, and even contradictory objects. Thus if we reason from the statement "Pegasus flies" to the statement "Pegasus exists", we are not asserting that Pegasus is made up of atoms, but rather that Pegasus exists in the worldview of classical myth. When a mathematician reasons from the statement "ABC is a triangle" to the statement "triangles exist", the mathematician is not asserting that triangles are made up of atoms but rather that triangles exist within a particular mathematical model.

Modern approaches
According to Bertrand Russell's Theory of Descriptions, the negation operator in a singular sentence can take either wide or narrow scope: we distinguish between "some S is not P" (where negation takes "narrow scope") and "it is not the case that 'some S is P'" (where negation takes "wide scope"). The problem with this view is that there appears to be no such scope distinction in the case of proper names. The sentences "Socrates is not bald" and "it is not the case that Socrates is bald" both appear to have the same meaning, and they both appear to assert or presuppose the existence of someone (Socrates) who is not bald, so that negation takes a narrow scope. However, Russell's theory analyses proper names into a logical structure which makes sense of this problem. According to Russell, Socrates can be analyzed into the form 'The Philosopher of Greece.' In the wide scope, this would then read: It is not the case that there existed a philosopher of Greece who was bald. In the narrow scope, it would read the Philosopher of Greece was not bald.

According to the direct-reference view, an early version of which was originally proposed by Bertrand Russell, and perhaps earlier by Gottlob Frege, a proper name strictly has no meaning when there is no object to which it refers. This view relies on the argument that the semantic function of a proper name is to tell us which object bears the name, and thus to identify some object. But no object can be identified if none exists. Thus, a proper name must have a bearer if it is to be meaningful.

Existence in the wide and narrow senses
According to the "two sense" view of existence, which derives from Alexius Meinong, existential statements fall into two classes:

 Those asserting existence in a wide sense. These are typical of the form "N is P" for singular N, or "some S is P".
 Those asserting existence in a narrow sense. These are typical of the form "N exists" or "Ss exist".

The problem is then evaded as follows. "Pegasus flies" implies existence in the wide sense, for it implies that something flies. But it does not imply existence in the narrow sense, for we deny existence in this sense by saying that Pegasus does not exist. In effect, the world of all things divides, on this view, into those (like Socrates, the planet Venus, and New York City) that have existed in the narrow sense, and those (like Sherlock Holmes, the goddess Venus, and Minas Tirith) that do not.

However, common sense suggests the non-existence of such things as fictional characters or fictional places.

European views 
Influenced by the views of Brentano's pupil Alexius Meinong, and by Edmund Husserl, Germanophone and Francophone philosophy took a different direction regarding the question of existence.

Anti-realist arguments
Anti-realism is the view of idealists who are skeptics about the physical world, maintaining either: (1) that nothing exists outside the mind, or (2) that we would have no access to a mind-independent reality even if it may exist. Realists, in contrast, hold that perceptions or sense data are caused by mind-independent objects. An "anti-realist" who denies that other minds exist (i. e., a solipsist) is different from an "anti-realist" who claims that there is no fact of the matter as to whether or not there are unobservable other minds (i. e., a logical behaviorist).

See also 

 Cogito ergo sum
 Conservation law (physics)
 Existence precedes essence
 Existence theorem
 Existential quantification
 Existentialism
 Human condition
 Religious views on the self 
 Solipsism
 Three marks of existence
 Universal quantification

References

Further reading 
 Aristotle, The Metaphysics, translated by Hugh Lawson-Tancred, Penguin Classics, 1999, 
 Antoine Arnauld and Pierre Nicole Logic, or the Art of Thinking, (known as the Port-Royal Logic), translated J. Buroker, Cambridge 1996
 Terry Eagleton, The Meaning of Life, Oxford University Press, 2007, 
 Heraclitus, Fragments, James Hilton, forward, Brooks Hexton, translator, Penguin Classics, 2003, 
 Michael J. Loux, Ockham's Theory Of Terms (translation of book I of the Summa Logicae c. 1327)
 Bryan Magee, The Story of Philosophy, Dorling Kindersley Lond. 1998, 
 John Stuart Mill, A System of Logic, 8th edition 1908* Plato, The Republic, translated by Desmond Lee, Penguin Classics, 2003, 
 Alvin Thalheimer, The Meaning of the Terms: Existence and Reality. Princeton University Press, 1920
 C.J.F. Williams, What is Existence?, Oxford University Press, 1981

External links 

 Existence, Internet Encyclopedia of Philosophy
 
 The Concept of Existence: History and Definitions from Leading Philosophers

Concepts in metaphysics
Metaphysical theories
Ontology
Reality